, also known as Kajō, was a  after Jōwa and before Ninju. This period spanned the years from June 848 through April 851.

Change of era
 February 9, 848 : The new era name Kashō (meaning "good augury") was created because a white tortoise was discovered in Bungo province, and it was duly presented to the emperor.  The previous era ended and the new one commenced in Jōwa 15, on the 13th day of the 6th month of 848.

Events of the Kashō era
 February 18, 848 (Kashō 1, 10th day of the 1st month): The dainagon Fujiwara no Yoshifusa (904–872) was named udaijin. He was the son of the former sadaijin Fujiwara Fuyutsugu (775–826).  Yoshifusa's daughter, Fujiwara no Akira-keiko, became Emperor Montoku's wife and the mother of Emperor Seiwa.
 848 (Kashō 1, 6th month): A white tortoise was discovered in Bungo Province.   As this was an extraordinary thing, all the court officials made their appearances before the emperor  with comments about the good augury this tortoise represented.
 849 (Kashō 2, 4th month): An ambassador from Baekje was received at court.
 849 (Kashō 2, 5th month): The ambassador from Baekje was received by the emperor, who entertained him.  Emperor Tenmyō charged Ono no Takamura to prepare a letter which was to be presented at the Baekje court.
 849 (Kashō 2, 10th month): Nimmyo celebrated his 40th birthday, and many presents were offered to him.
 849 (Kashō 2, 11th month): The emperor toured the capital in a grand procession; and when he passed by the prison, he ordered Yoshifusa to give freedom to all the prisoners held there.  Ninmyo caused rice and monies to be distributed amongst the poor.
 850 (Kashō 3, 1st month): The emperor made an official visit (chōkin) to the residence of his mother as a way of demonstrating filial piety.
 May 6, 850 (Kashō 3, 21st day of the 3rd month):  Emperor Ninmyō died at age 41; and his eldest son received the succession (senso).  Shortly thereafter, Emperor Montoku formally acceded to the throne (sokui).  According to his wishes, he was entombed without pomp or ceremony.  After this, the emperor was sometimes referred to as "the Emperor of Fukakasa", which was the name given to his mausoleum.  Emperor Ninmyo had reigned 17 years—14 years in the Jōwa era, and 3 years in the Kashō era.
 850 (Kashō 3, 5th month): Tachibana no Kachiko died. She was the widow of Emperor Saga and the mother of Emperor Ninmyō and the grandmother of Emperor Montoku.

Notes

References
 Brown, Delmer M. and Ichirō Ishida, eds. (1979).  Gukanshō: The Future and the Past. Berkeley: University of California Press. ;  OCLC 251325323
 Nussbaum, Louis-Frédéric and Käthe Roth. (2005).  Japan encyclopedia. Cambridge: Harvard University Press. ;  OCLC 58053128
 Titsingh, Isaac. (1834). Nihon Ōdai Ichiran; ou,  Annales des empereurs du Japon.  Paris: Royal Asiatic Society, Oriental Translation Fund of Great Britain and Ireland. OCLC 5850691
 Varley, H. Paul. (1980). A Chronicle of Gods and Sovereigns: Jinnō Shōtōki of Kitabatake Chikafusa. New York: Columbia University Press.  ;  OCLC 6042764

External links 
 National Diet Library, "The Japanese Calendar" -- historical overview plus illustrative images from library's collection

Japanese eras
9th century in Japan
848 beginnings
851 endings